United We Stand is the seventh live praise and worship album by Hillsong United. The CD comes with a free DVD which includes documentary footage, interviews and a bonus "United" Documentary. The album reached No. 28 on the ARIA Albums Chart.

Track listing

Notes
 "An Introduction" is stylized as "* (An Introduction)".
 "A Reprise" is stylized as "** (A Reprise)".
 The two "Selah" interludes are stylized as "*** (Selah)" and "**** (Selah)".

Unidos Permanecemos
Hillsong United has also recorded a Spanish version of United We Stand called Unidos Permanecemos.

Personnel 

 Marty Sampson – worship leader, acoustic guitar
 Joel Houston – worship leader, acoustic guitar
 Brooke Fraser – worship leader, acoustic guitar
 Jonathon Douglass – worship leader
 Jad Gillies – worship leader, electric guitar, acoustic guitar
 Annie Garratt – worship leader
 Holly Dawson – worship leader
 Anneka Kelly – backing vocals
 Mia Fieldes – backing vocals
 Sam Knock – backing vocals
 Michelle Fragar – backing vocals
 Graham Bronczyk – backing vocals 
 Rolf Wam Fjell – drums
 Matthew Tennikoff – bass guitar, keyboards
 Michael Guy Chislett – electric guitar
 Marcus Beaumont – electric guitar
 Nathan Taylor – electric guitar
 Dylan Thomas – electric guitar 
 Peter James – keyboards
 Kevin Lee – keyboards
 Dave George – keyboards
 Benjamin Tennikoff – keyboards

References 

Hillsong United albums
2006 live albums
2006 video albums
Live video albums
pt:United We Stand